Atlanta is an unincorporated community in the U.S. state of Michigan, along the 45th parallel.  It is a census-designated place (CDP) for statistical purposes and does not have any legal status as an incorporated municipality. The population was 757 at the 2000 census.  It is the county seat of Montmorency County.

East of Atlanta, M-32 and M-33 run concurrently for about six miles. The CDP also includes a small portion of Avery Township east of Atlanta and south of the Thunder Bay River. The Atlanta post office opened under the name Big Rock on March 24, 1882; the name was changed to Atlanta on October 2, 1882.

The Sno*Drift rally racing event is held in Atlanta annually. The event is currently the first Rally America National Rally Championship event of the season.

History

Atlanta was established in 1881 by Alfred J. West.

Geography
The Thunder Bay River flows into the community from the southwest and exits to the southeast.

Demographics

As of the census of 2000, there were 757 people, 339 households, and 215 families residing in the CDP. The racial makeup of the CDP was 98.41% White, 0.13% African American, 0.40% Native American, 0.40% Asian, and 0.66% from two or more races. Hispanic or Latino of any race were 0.40% of the population.

There were 339 households, out of which 27.1% had children under the age of 18 living with them, 46.3% were married couples living together, 13.6% had a female householder with no husband present, and 36.3% were non-families. 31.9% of all households were made up of individuals, and 15.3% had someone living alone who was 65 years of age or older.  The average household size was 2.22 and the average family size was 2.73.

In the CDP, the population was spread out, with 22.1% under the age of 18, 7.8% from 18 to 24, 22.3% from 25 to 44, 27.9% from 45 to 64, and 19.9% who were 65 years of age or older.  The median age was 43 years. For every 100 females, there were 89.3 males.  For every 100 females age 18 and over, there were 90.9 males.

The median income for a household in the CDP was $23,529, and the median income for a family was $37,188. Males had a median income of $28,250 versus $18,854 for females. The per capita income for the CDP was $15,178.  About 19.2% of families and 23.8% of the population were below the poverty line, including 33.8% of those under age 18 and 12.5% of those age 65 or over.

Major highways

Climate
This climatic region is typified by large seasonal temperature differences, with warm to hot (and often humid) summers and cold (sometimes severely cold) winters.  According to the Köppen Climate Classification system, Atlanta has a humid continental climate, abbreviated "Dfb" on climate maps.

References

Notes

Sources

External links
 Chamber of Commerce

Unincorporated communities in Montmorency County, Michigan
Census-designated places in Michigan
County seats in Michigan
Populated places established in 1881
Unincorporated communities in Michigan
Census-designated places in Montmorency County, Michigan
1881 establishments in Michigan